Chinese Historical Society of Southern California (CHSSC) is an organization based in Los Angeles Chinatown, California.

History 
On November 1, 1975, the society held its founding meeting at Cathay Bank in Los Angeles, California. Its key attendees include Paul Louie, William Mason, and Paul De Falla.

Its mission is as follows:
To bring together people with a mutual interest in the important history and historical role of Chinese and Chinese Americans in Southern California;
To pursue, preserve and communicate knowledge of this history; and
To promote the heritage of the Chinese and Chinese American community in support of a better appreciation of our rich, multi-cultural society.

CHSSC is an active historical societies in Southern California. There are monthly meetings, field trips, archive and library collections, oral history projects, scholarships, and publications.

They purchased the site of their present building in Bernard Street in the mid 1990s, constructing a Chinatown Heritage & Visitors Center, which is open to the public.

Projects
CHSSC have published several books; Duty & Honor in 1998, celebrating Chinese American world war II veterans, and Portraits of Pride I (2004)  & II (2012), collections of the biographies of high achieving, yet little known Chinese Americans.

19th Century Chinese Memorial Shrine Preservation Project 
In 1992 the society was able to purchase an 1880 shrine surrounded by 42 burial places in Evergreen Cemetery, which they restored. It is now a registered historic monument.

CHSSC Honorees
Each year the Chinese Historical Society of Southern California honors Chinese Americans who have made significant contributions to the greater Los Angeles community. They have included:
 2005 - Los Angeles Chinese American Pioneers in Law — Betty Tom Chu, Judge Rose Hom, You Chung Hong (1898-1977), Judge Ronald S.W. Lew (Chinese name: 刘成威), Judge Jennifer Lum, Judge Delbert Wong, Debra Yang (Chinese: 楊黃金玉)
 2006 - Chinese American Actors — including James Hong (Chinese: 吳漢章), Nancy Kwan (Chinese: 關家蒨), Russell Wong (Chinese: 王盛德)
 2007 - Los Angeles Chinese American Banking Pioneers — Preston Martin, F.Chow Chan, Cathay Bank (Chinese: 國泰銀行), East West Bank (Chinese: 華美銀行),  Far East National Bank (Chinese:遠東國民銀行),  First Public Savings,  General Bank Trust Savings, Standard Bank,  Golden Security Bank (金安銀行),  Eastern International,  The Continental Bank
 2008 - Chinese American Associations — Arcadia Chinese Association, Chinese American Association of Walnut, Diamond Bar Chinese American Association, San Gabriel Valley Chinese American Cultural Association, San Fernando Valley Chinese Cultural Association, South Bay Chinese Woman's Association, South Coast Chinese Cultural Association, South Pasadena Chinese American Club, and Ventura County Chinese American Historical Society
 2009 - Celebrating Chinese Americans in Sports — Michael Chang (Chinese: 張德培), Tennis player; Tiffany Chin (Chinese: 陳婷婷), Olympian; Bob Chow, Olympian;  Norm Chow (Chinese: 周友賢), football Coach; Lawrence Hom, volleyball player; Cameron Inouye, WNBA Referee; Carol Jue, college basketball head coach; Kim Ng, Los Angeles Dodgers; Jon Soo Hoo, sports photographer; Richard Tom, Olympian; Charles B. Wang (Chinese: 王嘉廉), Owner of New York Islanders Hockey Club; Kevin Wong, volleyball player; Annie Yee, cheerleader; Chinese American Athletic Association; Chinatown Firecracker Run Committee.
 2019 - Museum of Chinese in America —  Participated in exhibit: Gatherings: Collecting and Documenting Chinese American History

See also

History of the Chinese Americans in Los Angeles
Chinese American Museum
Chinese Culture Center
Chinese Historical Society of America
Museum of Chinese in America
Weaverville Joss House State Historic Park

References

External links
Chinese Historical Society of Southern California
 Chinese Historical Society of Southern California Collection (ca. 1880-1933) at digitallibrary.usc.edu

History of Southern California
Museums in Los Angeles
Chinese-American museums in California
Historical society museums in California
Historical societies in California
Chinatown, Los Angeles